The marbled rubber frog (Phrynomantis annectens) is a species of frog in the family Microhylidae.

It is found in Angola, Namibia, and South Africa.

Its natural habitats are dry savanna, subtropical or tropical dry shrubland, intermittent freshwater marshes, hot deserts, and temperate desert. Its survival often depends on finding deeper pools in inselbergs and other rocky formations. (Channing and Hogan. 2013)

The species is threatened by habitat loss.

References

 A. Channing & C. Michael Hogan. 2013. Species account for Phrynomantis annectens. ed. B. Zimkus. African Amphibians Lifedesk.

Phrynomantis
Amphibians described in 1910
Taxonomy articles created by Polbot